Billy Wayne Bailey (born June 7, 1957) is the Deputy Secretary of the West Virginia Department of Veterans Assistance.  He is  a former Democratic member of the West Virginia Senate, representing the 9th district from his appointment in January 1991 until leaving office in 2009.

Bailey decided to not seek re-election to the WV Senate in 2008 and instead ran an unsuccessful primary campaign for the WV Secretary of State. Billy Wayne Bailey currently resides in Cabell County.

External links
Follow the Money - Billy Wayne Bailey
2008 Secretary of State campaign contributions
2006 2004 2002 2000 Senate campaign contributions

1957 births
Living people
Democratic Party West Virginia state senators
People from Bluefield, West Virginia
Businesspeople from West Virginia
21st-century American politicians